Dallmeyer may refer to:

People
People with the surname Dallmeyer include:
 William Q. Dallmeyer (1829–1908), German-born Missouri politician
 John Henry Dallmeyer (1830–1883), Anglo-German optician
 His son Thomas Rudolphus Dallmeyer (1859–1906), English optician
 J H Dallmeyer Ltd, the lens manufacturing business that they founded
 Andrew Dallmeyer (1945–2017), Scottish playwright, theatre director and actor

Places 
 Dallmeyer Peak, a peak in Argentinian Antarctica